Christopher William Bradshaw Isherwood (26 August 1904 – 4 January 1986) was an Anglo-American novelist, playwright, screenwriter, autobiographer, and diarist. His best-known works include Goodbye to Berlin (1939), a semi-autobiographical novel which inspired the musical Cabaret; A Single Man (1964), adapted as a film by Tom Ford in 2009; and Christopher and His Kind (1976), a memoir which "carried him into the heart of the Gay Liberation movement".

Biography

Early life and work 
Isherwood was born in 1904 on his family's estate in Cheshire near Stockport in the north-west of England. He was the elder son of Francis Edward Bradshaw Isherwood (1869–1915), known as Frank, a professional soldier in the York and Lancaster Regiment, and Kathleen Bradshaw Isherwood, née Machell Smith (1868–1960), the only daughter of a successful wine merchant. He was the grandson of John Henry Isherwood, squire of Marple Hall and Wyberslegh Hall, Cheshire, and he included among his ancestors the Puritan judge John Bradshaw, who signed the death warrant of King Charles I and served for two years as Lord President of the Council, effectively President of the English Republic. Isherwood's father Frank was educated at the University of Cambridge and Sandhurst Military Academy, fought in the Boer War, and was killed in the First World War. Isherwood's mother, Kathleen, was, through her own mother, a member of the wealthy Greene brewing family of Greene King, and Isherwood was a cousin of the novelist Graham Greene, who was also related to the brewing family. Frank and Kathleen christened their first son Christopher William Bradshaw Isherwood, which Isherwood simplified on becoming a United States citizen in 1946.

At Repton, his boarding school in Derbyshire, Isherwood met his lifelong friend Edward Upward, with whom he invented an imaginary English village called Mortmere, as related in his fictional autobiography, Lions and Shadows (1938). He went up to Corpus Christi College, Cambridge, as a history scholar, wrote jokes and limericks on his second year Tripos and was asked to leave without a degree in 1925.

At Christmas 1925, he was reintroduced to a prep school friend, W. H. Auden. Through Auden, Isherwood met the younger poet, Stephen Spender, who printed Auden's first collection, Poems (1928). Upward, Isherwood, Auden, and Spender were identified as the most exciting new literary group in England in the 1930s. Auden dubbed Isherwood the novelist in what came to be known as the Auden Group or Auden Generation. With Cecil Day-Lewis and Louis MacNeice, Auden and Spender later attracted the name the MacSpaunday Poets, with which Isherwood is also associated.

After leaving Cambridge, Isherwood worked as a private tutor and later as secretary to a string quartet led by the violinist André Mangeot while he completed his first novel. This was All the Conspirators, published in 1928, about the struggle for self-determination between children and their parents. In October 1928, Isherwood enrolled as a medical student at King's College London, but he left after six months.

In March 1929, Isherwood joined Auden in Berlin, where Auden was spending a post-graduate year. The ten-day visit changed Isherwood's life. He began an affair with a German boy met at a cellar bar called The Cosy Corner, and he was "brought face to face with his tribe" at Magnus Hirschfeld's Institute for Sexual Science. He visited Berlin again in July, and moved there in November.

Sojourn in Berlin 

In Berlin, Isherwood completed his second novel, The Memorial (1932), about the impact of the First World War on his family and his generation. He also continued his habit of keeping a diary. In his diary, he gathered raw material for Mr. Norris Changes Trains (1935), inspired by his real-life friendship with Gerald Hamilton, and for Goodbye to Berlin (1939), his portrait of the city in which Adolf Hitler was rising to power—enabled by poverty, unemployment, increasing attacks on Jews and Communists, and ignored by the defiant hedonism of night life in the cafés, bars, and brothels. Goodbye to Berlin included stories published in the leftist magazine, New Writing, and it included Isherwood's 1937 novella Sally Bowles, in which he created his most famous character, based on a young Englishwoman, Jean Ross, with whom he briefly shared a flat.

In America, the Berlin novels were published together as The Berlin Stories in 1945. In 1951, Goodbye to Berlin was adapted for the New York stage by John van Druten using the title I Am a Camera, taken from Isherwood's opening paragraphs. The play inspired the hit Broadway musical Cabaret (1966), later adapted to film as Cabaret in 1972.

In 1932, Isherwood started a relationship with a young German, Heinz Neddermeyer. They fled Nazi Germany together in May 1933, traveling initially to Greece. Neddermeyer was refused entry to England in January 1934, launching an odyssey in search of a country where they could settle together. They lived in the Canary Islands, Copenhagen, Brussels, Amsterdam, and Sintra, Portugal, while trying to obtain a new nationality and passport for Neddermeyer. In May 1937, Neddermeyer was arrested by the Gestapo for draft evasion and reciprocal onanism.

During this period, Isherwood returned often to London where he took his first movie-writing job, working with Viennese director Berthold Viertel on the film Little Friend (1934). He collaborated with Auden on three plays – The Dog Beneath the Skin (1935), The Ascent of F6 (1936), and On the Frontier (1938) – all produced by Robert Medley and Rupert Doone's Group Theatre. He also worked on Lions and Shadows (1938), a fictionalized autobiography of his education — both in and out of school — in the 1920s.

In January 1938, Isherwood and Auden traveled to China to write Journey to a War (1939) about the Sino-Japanese conflict. They returned to England the following summer via the United States and decided to emigrate there in January 1939.

Life in the United States 

While living in Hollywood, California, Isherwood befriended Truman Capote, an up-and-coming young writer who would be influenced by Isherwood's Berlin Stories, most specifically in the traces of the story "Sally Bowles" that surface in Capote's famed novella Breakfast at Tiffany's.

Isherwood also befriended Dodie Smith, a British novelist and playwright who had also moved to California, and who became one of the few people to whom Isherwood showed his work in progress.

Isherwood considered becoming an American citizen in 1945 but balked at taking an oath that included the statement that he would defend the country. The next year he applied for citizenship and answered questions honestly, saying he would accept non-combatant duties like loading ships with food. The fact that he had volunteered for service with the Medical Corps also helped. At the naturalisation ceremony, he found he was required to swear to defend the nation and decided to take the oath since he had already stated his objections and reservations. He became an American citizen on 8 November 1946.

He began living with the photographer William "Bill" Caskey. In 1947, the two traveled to South America. Isherwood wrote the prose and Caskey took the photographs for a 1949 book about their journey entitled The Condor and the Cows.

On Valentine's Day 1953, at the age of 48, he met the teenager Don Bachardy among a group of friends on the beach at Santa Monica. Reports of Bachardy's age at the time vary, but Bachardy later said, "At the time I was probably 16." In fact, he was 18. Despite the age difference, this meeting began a partnership that, though interrupted by affairs and separations, continued until the end of Isherwood's life.

During the early months of their affair, Isherwood finished—and Bachardy typed—the novel on which he had worked for some years, The World in the Evening (1954). Isherwood also taught a course on modern English literature at Los Angeles State College (now California State University, Los Angeles) for several years during the 1950s and early 1960s.

The 30-year age difference between Isherwood and Bachardy raised eyebrows at the time, with Bachardy, in his own words, "regarded as a sort of child prostitute", but the two became a well-known and well-established couple in Southern Californian society with many Hollywood friends.

Down There on a Visit, a novel published in 1962, comprised four related stories that overlap the period covered in his Berlin stories. In the opinion of many reviewers, Isherwood's finest achievement was his 1964 novel A Single Man, that depicted a day in the life of George, a middle-aged, gay Englishman who is a professor at a Los Angeles university. The novel was adapted into a film of the same name in 2009. During 1964 Isherwood collaborated with American writer Terry Southern on the screenplay for the Tony Richardson film adaptation of The Loved One, Evelyn Waugh's caustic satire on the American funeral industry.

Isherwood and Bachardy lived together in Santa Monica for the rest of Isherwood's life. Isherwood was diagnosed with prostate cancer in 1981, and died of the disease on 4 January 1986 at his Santa Monica home, aged 81. His body was donated to medical science at UCLA, and his ashes were later scattered at sea. Bachardy became a successful artist with an independent reputation, and his portraits of the dying Isherwood became well known after Isherwood's death.

Association with Vedanta 

Gerald Heard had introduced British writer Aldous Huxley to Vedanta (Hindu-centered philosophy) and meditation. After migrating to America in 1937, Heard and Huxley became Vedantists attending functions at the Vedanta Society of Southern California, under the guidance of founder Swami Prabhavananda, a monk of the Ramakrishna Order of India. Both were initiated by the Swami. Heard and Huxley introduced Isherwood to the Swami's Vedanta Society. Over time, Isherwood developed a close friendship with Huxley, with whom he sometimes collaborated.  Isherwood became a dedicated Vedantist himself and was initiated by Prabhavananda, his guru.

The process of conversion to Vedanta was so intense that Isherwood was unable to write another novel between the years 1939–1945, while he immersed himself in study of the Vedanta Scriptures, even becoming a monk for a time at the Society. For the next 35 years Isherwood collaborated with the Swami on translations of various Vedanta scriptures, including the Bhagavad Gita – The Song of God, writing articles for the Society's journal, and occasionally lecturing at the Hollywood and Santa Barbara temples. For many years he would come to the Hollywood temple on Wednesday nights to read the Gospel of Ramakrishna for a half an hour, then the Swami would take questions from the devotees.

From 1950 to 1978, Isherwood gave 53 lectures at the Hollywood and Santa Barbara Vedanta Temples. He mentions in his diaries and the book, My Guru and His Disciple, that he feels unqualified to preach, so most of his lectures were readings of papers written by others, primarily Swami Vivekananda. There were a few original lectures including, Who Is Ramakrishna, The Writer and Vedanta, and a lecture on Girish Chandra Ghosh, a householder disciple of Ramakrishna.

Isherwood was also very involved in the production of the bi-monthly journal of the Vedanta Society of Southern California, Vedanta and the West. From 1943 to 1945 he was Managing Editor, from 1951 to 1962 he was an Editorial Advisor together with Aldous Huxley, Gerald Heard, and additionally with John van Druten from 1951 to 1958. From 1949 to 1969 he wrote 40 articles for the journal.

Isherwood and War 

Isherwood's father, Frank Bradshaw-Isherwood, was a colonel in the British Army. He was killed during WWI in the Battle Ypres, France in May 1915, at the age of 46. Isherwood was 10 years old at the time. His father's death “...deeply affected him, not only in his perspective of his father and how he would relate to his mother, but in his attitude towards the military and war itself." Isherwood's second novel, The Memorial, published in 1932, describes the impact on a family from the death of the father in WWI. The Memorial was the first of what would become the trademark for Isherwood: reflecting his life experience into the plot of a novel.

After being asked to leave Oxford, he lived in Berlin and witnessed the rising power of Fascism, the Nazi Party, and Hitler. Isherwood describes the times in his autobiographical novels The Berlin Stories. In 1933, Isherwood fled Germany with his friend Heinz Neddermeyer seeking asylum for Heinz - who was refused entry to England. Heinz was finally arrested in the May 1937 by the Gestapo for draft evasion and practicing homosexuality.

Back in London, Isherwood's sympathies were with the left, but although the Anti-war movement flourished after WWI, it was fractured into opposing ideological groups. Some wanted to join the fight in the Spanish Civil War, others wanting to just let the Germans in, rather than go to war, still others advocated non-violent resistance, all of which had the effect of weakening their political power. The fighting in Spain was savage, and "...the left tore itself apart with squabbling and paranoia. Veterans came to feel that the idealism of the cause had been exploited, and many resented being policed by shadowy Communist enforcers."

In 1937, two of the largest peace groups joined forces; the No More War Movement merged into the Peace Pledge Union. The members attested to the following pledge: "War is a crime against humanity. I renounce war, and am therefore determined not to support any kind of war. I am also determined to work for the removal of all causes of war". Some of the leading authors and intellectuals of the time gave speeches and lent their names to the cause, including Gerald Heard, Aldous Huxley, and Bertrand Russell.

Inspired by Hemingway's reporting from the Spanish Civil War, in January 1938, Isherwood and his friend W. H. Auden traveled to China to cover the invasion by Japan and wrote Journey to a War (1939). They returned to England the following summer via the United States and decided to emigrate there in January 1939. At this point Isherwood wasn't clear about his own anti-war beliefs. On the way to America, he realized he was a Pacifist, as he would be unwilling to kill his friend Heinz, "Heinz is in the Nazi army. I wouldn't kill Heinz. Therefore I have no right to kill anybody". He had lost his political faith, "I couldn't repeat the left-wing slogans which I had been repeating throughout the last few years."

After moving to California, Isherwood sought "...advice from Gerald Heard and Aldous Huxley about becoming a pacifist, and, like them, he became a disciple of the Ramakrishna monk, Swami Prabhavananda, head of the Vedanta Society of Southern California." He applied for citizenship and registered as a Conscientiousness Objector. In Pennsylvania, he worked in a Quaker Hostel, helping to settle European Jews who were fleeing the Nazis.

In 1944, the translation of the Hindu scripture, Bhagavad Gita – The Song of God that the Swami and Isherwood had been working on was published. In the appendix, there is an essay by Isherwood titled, The Gita and War. There Isherwood explains the Vedantic view of war and duty. The plot of the poem is that the whole of India is drawn into a great battle, and on the eve of the fight, Arjuna, the hero warrior of the epic poem, The Mahabharata, is taken between the two armies and sees friends, family, and worthy people on both sides, throws down his weapons and says, "I will not fight." The rest of the book has Lord Krishna, Arjuna's friend and advisor, explaining the nature of duty. It may be, for some person, at some time, it proper to refuse to fight, but if the cause is righteous, and it's your duty as a warrior to fight, it would be a moral hazard to refuse.

Legacy and recognition

 The house in the  district of Berlin where Isherwood lived bears a memorial plaque to mark his stay there between 1929 and 1933.
 Isherwood is mentioned in Susan Sontag's Notes on "Camp" (1964): "Apart from a lazy two-page sketch in Christopher Isherwood's novel The World in the Evening (1954), [camp] has hardly broken into print."
 The 2008 film Chris & Don: A Love Story chronicled Isherwood and Bachardy's lifelong relationship.
 A Single Man was adapted into a film, A Single Man, in 2009.
 In 2010 Isherwood's autobiography, Christopher and His Kind, was adapted into a television film by the BBC, starring Matt Smith as Isherwood and directed by Geoffrey Sax. It was broadcast in France and Germany on the Arte channel in February 2011, and in Britain on BBC 2 the following month.
 The annual Los Angeles Times – Christopher Isherwood Prize for Autobiographical Prose was established in partnership with the Los Angeles Times in 2016.

Works
 All the Conspirators (1928; new edition 1957 with new foreword)
 The Memorial (1932)
 Mr Norris Changes Trains (1935; U.S. edition titled The Last of Mr Norris)
 The Dog Beneath the Skin (1935, with W. H. Auden)
 The Ascent of F6 (1937, with W. H. Auden)
 Sally Bowles (1937; later included in Goodbye to Berlin)
 On the Frontier (1938, with W. H. Auden)
 Lions and Shadows (1938, autobiographical fiction). Reissued: Minneapolis: University of Minnesota Press, 2000
 Goodbye to Berlin (1939)
 Journey to a War (1939, with W. H. Auden)
 Bhagavad Gita, The Song of God (1944, with Prabhavananda)
 Vedanta for the Western World (1945, Marcel Rodd Co.; published in England by George Allen & Unwin, 1948; ed. and introduction, plus several contributions)
 Prater Violet (1945)
 The Berlin Stories (1945; contains Mr Norris Changes Trains and Goodbye to Berlin; reissued as The Berlin of Sally Bowles, 1975)
 The Condor and the Cows (1949, South-American travel diary)
 Vedanta for Modern Man (1951, Harper & Brothers; published in England by George Allen & Unwin, 1952; ed. and contributor)
 What Vedanta Means to Me (1951, pamphlet)
 The World in the Evening (1954)
 Down There on a Visit (1962)
 An Approach to Vedanta (1963)
 A Single Man (1964)
 Ramakrishna and His Disciples (1965)
 Exhumations (1966; journalism and stories)
 A Meeting by the River (1967)
 Essentials of Vedanta (1969)
 Kathleen and Frank (1971, about Isherwood's parents)
 Frankenstein: The True Story (1973, with Don Bachardy; based on their 1973 film script)
 Christopher and His Kind (1976, autobiography), 130-copy edition printed by Sylvester & Orphanos, regular publication by Farrar, Straus, & Giroux
 My Guru and His Disciple (1980)
 October (1980, with Don Bachardy)
 The Mortmere Stories (with Edward Upward) (1994)
 Where Joy Resides: An Isherwood Reader (1989; Don Bachardy and James P. White, eds.)
 Diaries: 1939–1960, Katherine Bucknell, ed. (1996)
 Jacob's Hands: A Fable (1997) originally co-written with Aldous Huxley
 Lost Years: A Memoir 1945–1951, Katherine Bucknell, ed. (2000)
 Kathleen and Christopher, Lisa Colletta, ed. (Letters to his mother, Minneapolis: University of Minnesota Press, 2005)
 Isherwood on Writing (University of Minnesota Press, 2007)
 The Sixties: Diaries:1960–1969 Katherine Bucknell, ed. 2010
 Liberation: Diaries:1970–1983 Katherine Bucknell, ed. 2012
 The Animals: Love Letters Between Christopher Isherwood and Don Bachardy, Edited by Katherine Bucknell (Farrar, Straus and Giroux, 2014)

Translations
 , Intimate Journals (1930; revised edition 1947)
 The Song of God: Bhagavad-Gita (with Swami Prabhavananda, 1944)
 Shankara's Crest-Jewel of Discrimination (with Swami Prabhavananda, 1947)
 How to Know God: The Yoga Aphorisms of Patanjali (with Swami Prabhavananda, 1953)

Work on Vedanta and the West
Vedanta and the West (originally titled Voice of India from 1938–1940) was the official publication of the Vedanta Society of Southern California. It offered essays by many of the leading intellectuals of the time and had contributions from Aldous Huxley, Gerald Heard, Alan Watts, J. Krishnamurti, W. Somerset Maugham, and many others.

Isherwood wrote the following articles that appeared in Vedanta and the West:

 Vivekananda and Sarah Bernhardt – 1943
 On Translating the Gita – 1944
 Hypothesis and Belief – 1944
 The Gita and War – 1944
 What is Vedanta? – 1944
 Ramakrishna and Vivekananda – 1945
 The Problem of the Religious Novel – 1946
 Religion Without Prayers – 1946
 Foreword to a Man of Boys – 1950
 An Introduction – 1951
 What Vedanta Means to Me – 1951
 Who Is Ramakrishna? – 1957
 Ramakrishna and the Future – 1958
 The Home of Ramakrishna – 1958
 Ramakrishna: A First Chapter – 1959
 The Birth of Ramakrishna – 1959
 The Boyhood of Ramakrishna – 1959
 How Ramakrishna Came to Dakshineswar – 1959
 Early Days at Dakshineswar – 1959
 The Vision of Kali – 1960

 The Marriage of Ramakrishna – 1960
 The Coming of the Bhariravi – 1960
 Some Visitors to Dakshineswar – 1960
 Tota Puri – 1960
 The Writer and Vedanta – 1961
 Mathur – 1961
 Sarada and Chandra – 1962
 Keshab Sen – 1962
 The Coming of the Disciples – 1962
 Introduction to Vivekananda – 1962
 Naren – 1963
 The Training of Naren – 1963
 An Approach to Vedanta – 1963
 The Young Monks – 1963
 Some Great Devotees – 1963
 The Gospel of Sri Ramakrishna – 1963
 The Last Year – 1964
 The Story Continues – 1964
 Letters of Swami Vivekananda – 1968
 Essentials of Vedanta – 1969

In 1945 sixty-eight articles from Vedanta and the West were collected in book form as Vedanta for the Western World. Isherwood edited the selection and provided an introduction and three articles ("Hypothesis and Belief", "Vivekananda and Sarah Bernhardt", "The Gita and War"). Other contributors included Aldous Huxley, Gerald Heard, Swami Prabhavananda, Swami Vivekananda, and John Van Druten.

Audio and video recordings
 Christopher Isherwood reads selections from the Bhagavad Gita – CD
 Christopher Isherwood reads selections from the Upanishads – CD
 Lecture on Girish Ghosh – CD
 Christopher Isherwood Reads Two Lectures on the Bhagavad Gita by Swami Vivekananda – DVD

See also

References

Notes

Bibliography
Parker, Peter (2004) Isherwood: A Life, Picador. 
Fryer, Jonathan (1977), Isherwood: A Biography, Garden City, NY, Doubleday & Company. .

Further reading
 Berg, James J. and Freeman, Chris eds, Isherwood in Transit (2020) 
 Berg, James J. and Freeman, Chris eds, Conversations with Christopher Isherwood (2001)
 Berg, James J. and Freeman, Chris eds. The Isherwood Century: Essays on the Life and Work of Christopher Isherwood (2000)
 Finney, Brian. Christopher Isherwood: A Critical Biography (1979)
 Marsh, Victor. Mr Isherwood Changes Trains: Christopher Isherwood and the search for the 'home self (2010) Clouds of Magellen 
 Page, Norman. Auden and Isherwood: The Berlin Years (2000)
 Prosser, Lee. Isherwood, Bowles, Vedanta, Wicca, and Me (2001) 
 Prosser, Lee. Night Tigers (2002)

External links

 
 
 
Christopher Isherwood Foundation
 Christopher Isherwood Collection at the Harry Ransom Center
 Materials related to Christopher Isherwood in the Robert A. Wilson collection held by Special Collections, University of Delaware
 
 Isherwood Exhibit at the Huntington 
Where Joy Resides An Isherwood Reader 
"Cabaret Berlin" Information on Christopher Isherwood and the entertainment of the Weimar era
LitWeb.net: Christopher Isherwood Biography

1904 births
1986 deaths
20th-century American novelists
20th-century English novelists
Alumni of Corpus Christi College, Cambridge
Alumni of King's College London
American conscientious objectors
American Hindus
American male novelists
English pacifists
California State University, Los Angeles faculty
Deaths from cancer in California
Converts to Hinduism
Deaths from prostate cancer
English short story writers
LGBT Hindus
People educated at Repton School
Writers from Santa Monica, California
People from Stockport
People from Disley
American gay writers
English gay writers
Gay memoirists
American LGBT novelists
English LGBT novelists
American male short story writers
20th-century American short story writers
20th-century American male writers
20th-century LGBT people
British emigrants to the United States
Members of the American Academy of Arts and Letters